Maximiliano Iván Pollacchi (born 4 January 1995) is an Argentine professional footballer who plays as a centre-back for Sportivo Las Parejas.

Career
Pollacchi began with Argentine Primera División side Newell's Old Boys. He first appeared on a first-team teamsheet for the club during the 2011–12 season, being unused for games against Banfield and Olimpo. He was an unused substitute twelve more times in all competitions for Newell's Old Boys between 2012 and 2014. On 30 June 2017, Pollacchi joined Colegiales of Primera B Metropolitana. His professional debut arrived on 24 September during a draw with Estudiantes. Central Córdoba became Pollacchi's third club in July 2018. Pollacchi made twenty-three appearances in one season in Primera C Metropolitana.

August 2019 saw Pollacchi head to Torneo Federal A with Sportivo Las Parejas. He scored goals against Central Norte, Sarmiento and San Martín de Formosa in a campaign that was ended early due to the COVID-19 pandemic. In September 2020, Pollacchi signed for Primera B Nacional's Villa Dálmine. Ahead of the 2022 season, Pollacchi returned to Sportivo Las Parejas.

Career statistics
.

References

External links

1995 births
Living people
Footballers from Rosario, Santa Fe
Argentine footballers
Association football defenders
Argentine Primera División players
Primera B Metropolitana players
Primera C Metropolitana players
Torneo Federal A players
Newell's Old Boys footballers
Club Atlético Colegiales (Argentina) players
Central Córdoba de Rosario footballers
Sportivo Las Parejas footballers
Villa Dálmine footballers